Korowya is a river of the Nile basin. Rising in the mountains of Dogu’a Tembien in northern Ethiopia, it flows westward to empty finally in the Weri’i and Tekezé River.

Characteristics 
It is a meandering stream in a semi-confined alluvial plain, with an average slope gradient of 31 metres per kilometre.

Flash floods and flood buffering

Runoff mostly happens in the form of high runoff discharge events that occur in a very short period (called flash floods). These are related to the steep topography, often little vegetation cover and intense convective rainfall. The peaks of such flash floods have often a 50 to 100 times larger discharge than the preceding baseflow.
The magnitude of floods in this river has not been decreased due to interventions in the catchment. Physical conservation structures such as stone bunds and check dams are few and insufficient. On many steep slopes, there are remnant forests; the dense vegetation contributes to enhanced infiltration, but cannot buffer the floods.

Irrigated agriculture
Irrigation is strongly dependent on the river's baseflow. Such irrigated agriculture is important in meeting the demands for food security and poverty reduction. Irrigated lands are established in the lower alluvial plains of Korowya River, and near springs at the headwaters.

Boulders and pebbles in the river bed
From upstream to downstream, the following lithological units occur in the catchment.
 Lower basalt
 Amba Aradam Formation
 Antalo Limestone
 Adigrat Sandstone
Mostly the river bed is composed of sand, but one may find some pebbles, representing a mix of all lithologies crossed by the river.

From upper to lower Tembien
During its course, this river passes through two woredas. On the various parts:
 The headwaters are in Dogu’a Tembien
 Most of the lower plain is in Kola Tembien

Trekking along the river
A trekking route has been established along this river. The tracks are not marked on the ground but can be followed using downloaded .GPX files.
 Trek 21, along and parallel to Korowya River
In the rainy season, flash floods may occur and it is advised not to follow the river bed. At times it may be impossible to cross the river in the rainy season.

See also 
 List of Ethiopian rivers

References

Rivers of Ethiopia
Dogu'a Tembien
Tigray Region
Nile basin
Rivers of Africa